The 493rd Fighter Squadron (493rd FS), nicknamed the Grim Reapers, is part of the United States Air Force's 48th Fighter Wing located at RAF Lakenheath, Suffolk, United Kingdom.  The 493rd is currently not equipped with any aircraft but is expected to receive the Lockheed Martin F-35A Lightning II in late 2022. Between 1993 and 2022 it operated the McDonnell Douglas F-15C/D Eagle, providing air-to-air offensive and defensive support for United States and NATO operations.  The squadron has earned multiple commendations and awards, including the Air Force Association's Hughes Trophy in 1997 and 1999 and the 2007, 2014, 2016 and 2019 Raytheon Trophies, for being recognized as the top fighter squadron in the United States Air Force.

History

World War II
Activated as a Southeastern Air District Army Air Corps training squadron, equipped with a variety of second-line aircraft, both single and twin engine, preparing its pilots and maintenance crews for eventual combat.  After the Pearl Harbor Attack, the squadron flew antisubmarine patrols from March to April 1942.   Resumed aircrew training, many of the group's members went on to serve in squadrons stationed in Europe and the Pacific theaters.

Eventually coming under the AAF III Fighter Command in 1944, trained replacement pilots with Republic P-47 Thunderbolts, Converted in January 1944 to an operational fighter squadron.   Deployed to the European Theater of Operations, being assigned to the IX Fighter Command in England, March 1944.

Almost immediately after their arrival, the squadron began a rigorous training program, flying dive-bombing, glide bombing, night flying, low-level navigation, smoke laying, reconnaissance, and patrol convoy sorties. Over the next two months, the number of sorties steadily increased and the squadron flew its first combat mission on 20 April 1944, an uneventful fighter sweep of the occupied French coast.

Assisted the Normandy invasion by dropping bombs on bridges and gun positions, attacking rail lines and trains, and providing visual reconnaissance reports.  Moved to France in mid-June 1944, supporting ground operations of Allied forces moving east across northern France throughout the war: primarily providing support for the United States First Army.   Eventually was stationed in Occupied Germany on V-E Day.

On 5 July 1945, the squadron arrived in Laon, France. After a few weeks back in France the squadron received orders to return to the US. With many of the members separating at port, those remaining set up the headquarters at Seymour Johnson Field, North Carolina and was programmed for deployment to Okinawa to take part in planned Invasion of Japan. Training discontinued after Atomic bombings of Hiroshima and Nagasaki and the sudden end of the Pacific War.

Two months later on 7 November 1945, the squadron inactivated as part of the massive postwar draw down.

Cold War

The squadron was reactivated in 1952 as a NATO Fighter-Bomber squadron stationed in France.  Equipped initially with Republic F-84G Thunderjets, upgraded in 1954 to North American F-86F Sabre aircraft. conducted operational readiness exercises and tactical evaluations.  Honing bombing and gunnery skills, the squadron frequently deployed to Wheelus Air Base, Libya for training.

Then in late 1956 the squadron upgraded to the North American F-100D Super Sabre.  However, the nuclear-weapon-capable F-100 caused disagreements with France concerning atomic storage and custody issues within NATO, resulting in a decision to remove Air Force atomic-capable units from French soil.  On 15 January 1960, the squadron and its parent 48th Tactical Fighter Wing moved to RAF Lakenheath, UK.

Between 1960 and 1972, the squadron's F-100 fleet maintained its readiness by participating in a number of USAFE and NATO exercises training to react to possible aggression from the Soviet Union. They underwent a series of NATO tactical evaluations.  The squadron conducted several deployments to Turkey, Italy, Spain, and across the United Kingdom.

Beginning in late 1971, the squadron started its conversion to the McDonnell Douglas F-4D Phantom II, with the aircraft being transferred from the 81st Tactical Fighter Wing at RAF Bentwaters. The conversion to the F-4D took several years, with the last F-100 departing in August 1974. With the arrival of the Phantoms, the F-4s adopted a common tail code of "LK". This tail code lasted only a few months as in July and August 1972 the 48th Wing further recoded to "LN".

The F-4's service with squadron was short as Operation Ready Switch transferred the F-4Ds to the 474th Tactical Fighter Wing at Nellis Air Force Base Nevada. The 474th sent their General Dynamics F-111As to the 347th Tactical Fighter Wing at Mountain Home Air Force Base, Idaho, and the 347th sent their F-111Fs to Lakenheath in early 1977. Unlike the previous F-4 transition, the F-111 change took place quickly and without any significant problems. Almost immediately after changing aircraft, the squadron began a series of monthly exercises and deployments that took the Liberty Wing to Italy, Iran, Greece, and Pakistan.

The 48th Wing also participated in Operation El Dorado Canyon, the air raid on Tripoli, Libya on 14 and 15 April 1986.  It flew combat missions in Southwest Asia from January to February 1991 as part of Operation Desert Storm.

The 493rd was redesignated as the 493rd Fighter Squadron on 1 October 1991. The 493rd FS was inactivated as a F-111F unit on 18 December 1992.

Eagle (1993–2022)

The unit began working up as a McDonnell Douglas F-15C/D Eagle squadron, receiving their first two jets, F-15C 86-0164 and F-15D 86-0182, on 15 November 1993 from Bitburg Air Base, Germany. The change from the F-111F to the Eagle marked the first time that the squadron had flown a specifically air-to-air weapon system, after flying for more than 50 years with an air-to-ground mission. The squadron received the last production block of new F-15 Eagles. The 493rd Fighter Squadron was reactivated on 1 January 1994. The Grim Reapers received the rest of their 18 assigned Eagles from Langley AFB and Eglin AFB, with the last one (86-0160) arriving on 22 July 1994.

In 1998, the 493rd FS received another six F-15Cs, increasing the squadron size to 24 aircraft. These came from the 53rd Fighter Squadron based at Spangdahlem Air Base, Germany, due to it being inactivated because of the USAF consolidating its squadrons.

On 3 August 2000, F-15C 86-0173 was written off after crashing 13 miles NE of Rachel, Nevada, during a Green Flag Exercise – the pilot safely ejected.

On 26 March 2001, two F-15Cs from the 493rd FS (86-0169 and 86-0180) crashed into Ben Macdui in the Cairngorms mountain range, both pilots died in the crash.

In June 2008, the Grim Reapers were selected as the 2007 Raytheon Trophy winners, the first time in 10 years they had been recognised as the best fighter squadron in the USAF.

The squadron participated in Operation Odyssey Dawn in Libya in March 2011, along with numerous deployments to Southwest Asia supporting air expeditionary units as part of the ongoing Global War on Terrorism and as part of Operation Iraqi Freedom and Operation Enduring Freedom.

In January 2015, the squadron was named the best fighter squadron in the Air Force, earning the Raytheon Trophy for 2014.

On 13 May 2017, the 493rd FS were awarded the 2016 Raytheon Trophy at the Imperial War Museum Duxford.

In April 2020, the Grim Reapers were awarded the 2019 Raytheon Trophy. On 15 June 2020, F-15C 86-0176 crashed into the North Sea during a training mission, killing the pilot.

During the prelude to the 2022 Russian invasion of Ukraine, the Grim Reapers deployed eight F-15C/Ds to Łask Air Base, Poland, in February 2022 to perform NATO enhanced Air Policing (eAP). It was the last NATO mission the squadron undertook with the Eagle.

Future
In 2022, the 493rd FS will inactivate after its fleet of F-15Cs and Ds return to the United States in preparation to re-equip and reactivate with the F-35A Lightning II. The 493rd's future F-35A flagship (19-5493) was delivered to RAF Lakenheath on 15 April 2022.

Lineage
 Constituted as the 56th Bombardment Squadron (Light) on 20 November 1940
 Activated on 15 January 1941
 Redesignated 56th Bombardment Squadron (Dive) on 28 August 1942
 Redesignated 493d Fighter-Bomber Squadron on 10 August 1943
 Redesignated 493d Fighter Squadron, Single Engine on 30 May 1944
 Inactivated on 7 November 1945
 Redesignated 493d Fighter-Bomber Squadron on 25 June 1952
 Activated on 10 July 1952
 Redesignated 493d Tactical Fighter Squadron on 8 July 1958
 Redesignated 493d Fighter Squadron on 1 October 1991
 Inactivated on 18 December 1992
 Activated on 1 January 1994

Assignments
 48th Bombardment Group (later 48th Fighter-Bomber Group, 48th Fighter Group), 15 January 1941 – 7 November 1945
 48th Fighter-Bomber Group, 10 July 1952
 48th Fighter-Bomber Wing (later 48th Tactical Fighter Wing, 48th Fighter Wing), 8 December 1957 – 18 December 1992
 Attached to 48th Fighter Wing (Provisional), 2 September 1990 – 15 March 1991; 7440th Composite Wing, September – December 1991
 48th Operations Group, 1 January 1994 – present

Stations

 Hunter Field, Georgia, 15 January 1941
 Will Rogers Field, Oklahoma, 23 May 1941
 Hunter Field, Georgia, 7 February 1942
 Key Field, Mississippi, 28 June 1942
 William Northern Field, Tennessee, 20 August 1943
 Walterboro Army Air Field, South Carolina, 27 January – 13 March 1944
 RAF Ibsley (AAF-347), England, 29 March 1944
 Deux Jumeaux Airfield (A-4), France, 18 June 1944
 Villacoublay Airfield (A-42), France, 29 August 1944
 Cambrai/Niergnies Airfield (A-74), France, 15 September 1944

 Sint-Truiden Airfield (A-92), Belgium, 30 September 1944
 Kelz Airfield (Y-54), Germany, 26 March 1945
 Kassel-Rothwesten Airfield (R-12), Germany, 18 April 1945
 Illesheim Airfield (R-10), Germany, 25 April 1945
 Laon, France (Ground Echelon), 5 July – August 1945
 Seymour Johnson Field, North Carolina, 9 September – 7 November 1945
 Chaumont-Semoutiers Air Base, France, 10 July 1952
 RAF Lakenheath, England, 11 January 1960 – present
 Deployed to Ta’if, Saudi Arabia, 2 September 1990 – 15 March 1991; Incirlik Air Base, Turkey, September – December 1991

Aircraft

 Curtiss A-18 Shrike (1941)
 Douglas A-20 Havoc (1941–1942)
 Vultee A-35 Vengeance (1942–1943)
 Curtiss P-40 Warhawk (1943)
 Bell P-39 Airacobra (1943–1944)
 Republic P-47 Thunderbolt (1944–1945)

 Republic F-84G Thunderjet (1952–1954)
 North American F-86F Sabre (1953–1956)
 North American F-100D Super Sabre (1956–1972)
 McDonnell Douglas F-4D Phantom II (1972–1977)
 General Dynamics F-111F Aardvark (1977–1992)
 McDonnell Douglas F-15C/D Eagle (1993–2022)

Operations
World War II
Operation El Dorado Canyon
Operation Desert Storm

References

Notes
 Explanatory notes

 Citations

Bibliography

External links
Fighter Squadron History
48th Operations Group Fact Sheet
493rd Fighter Squadron
Lakenheath's 493rd FS awarded 2014 Raytheon Trophy
The History, Heritage, and Heraldry of the 48th Fighter Wing

493
Fighter squadrons of the United States Army Air Forces
Military units and formations established in 1940